Donald Aitcheson (born 14 September 1916) was a Jamaican cricketer. He played in two first-class matches for the Jamaican cricket team in 1946/47.

See also
 List of Jamaican representative cricketers

References

External links
 

1916 births
Year of death missing
Jamaican cricketers
Jamaica cricketers
Place of birth missing